Hrymr (also Hrym or Rym) is a jötunn in Norse mythology. During the final battle of Ragnarök, Hrym will bring with him all the legions of the jötnar (giants) toward the field of Vígríðr to confront the Æsir (gods).

Name 
The etymology of the Old Norse name Hrym is unclear. Andy Orchard has proposed the meaning 'decrepit'. Jan de Vries argues that a relation with hrumr ('weak, fragile') is semantically questionable.

Attestations 
In Völuspá (Prophecy of the Völva), Hrym plays a major role in the apocalyptic events of Ragnarök.

In Gylfaginning (The Beguiling of Gylfi, 51), he is depicted as the captain of Naglfar, the ship that will ferry the enemies of the gods during Ragnarök, directly contradicting the version of Völuspá where it is the god Loki who will steer the ship.

References

Citations

General and cited references  
 
 

Jötnar